Maurice Schexnayder (August 13, 1895 – January 23, 1981) was an American prelate of the Roman Catholic Church. He served as bishop of the Diocese of Lafayette in Louisiana from 1956 to 1972.

Biography

Early life 
Maurice Schexnayder was born on August 13, 1895, in Wallace, Louisiana, to Adam and Jeanne Marie (née Dutreix) Schexnayder. After attending schools in Wallace and New Orleans, he entered St. Joseph College Seminary near Covington in 1916. He then attended St. Mary Seminary in Baltimore, Maryland, before furthering his studies at the Pontifical North American College in Rome.

Priesthood 
Schexnayder was ordained to the priesthood in Rome on April 12, 1925. Following his return to Louisiana, he served as a curate at St. John the Evangelist Parish in Plaquemine.  In  1929, he was appointed chaplain of the Newman Club at Louisiana State University in Baton Rouge, Louisiana. Schexnayder also served as state chaplain of the Knights of Columbus (1932–1944) and pastor of St. Francis de Sales Parish in Houma, Louisiana (1946–1950). He was named a domestic prelate in 1947.

Auxiliary Bishop and Bishop of Lafayette 
On December 11, 1950, Schexnayder was appointed auxiliary bishop of the Diocese of Lafayette and Titular Bishop of Tuscamia by Pope Pius XII. He received his episcopal consecration on February 22, 1951, from Archbishop Amleto Cicognani, with Bishops Jules Jeanmard and Louis Caillouet serving as co-consecrators. In addition to his episcopal duties, he served as pastor of St. Michael Parish in Crowley, Louisiana. 

Upon the resignation of Bishop Jeanmard, Schexnayder was named the second Bishop of Lafayette on March 13, 1956. During his tenure, he built a new chancery building, expanded Immaculata Minor Seminary, established thirty-one parishes, and ordained eighty-one priests. In 1961, he established St. Eugene Catholic Church in Grand Chenier in Cameron Parish. Schexnayder attended all four sessions of the Second Vatican Council in Rome between 1962 and 1965.

Retirement and legacy 
Onn November 7, 1972, Pope Paul VI accepted Schexnayder's resignation as bishop of Lafayette. Maurice Schexnayder died in Lafayette on January 23, 1981, at age 85. He is buried at the Cathedral of Saint John the Evangelist in Lafayette.

In 2014, documents were released that criticized Schexnayder for protecting priests accused of sexually abusing children. In a lawsuit, the diocese's insurance company "argued that the diocese knew for years, if not decades, that some of their priests had fondled and even raped children" and that "the molestations took place largely during the reigns of Bishops Maurice Schexnayder" and his successor, Bishop Gerard Louis Frey.

References

1895 births
1981 deaths
People from St. John the Baptist Parish, Louisiana
Participants in the Second Vatican Council
Saint Joseph Seminary College alumni
Catholics from Louisiana
20th-century Roman Catholic bishops in the United States